Paola Suárez was the defending champion, but lost in quarterfinals to eventual tournament winner Fabiola Zuluaga.

Fabiola Zuluaga won the title by defeating Katarina Srebotnik 6–1, 6–4 in the final.

Seeds
The first two seeds received a bye into the second round.

Draw

Finals

Top half

Bottom half

Qualifying

Seeds

Qualifiers

Qualifying draw

First qualifier

Second qualifier

Third qualifier

Fourth qualifier

References
 Official results archive (ITF)
 Official results archive (WTA)

Copa Colsanitas - Singles
2002 Singles